Winter's law, named after Werner Winter, who postulated it in 1978, is a proposed sound law operating on Balto-Slavic short vowels */e/, */o/, */a/ (< PIE *h₂e), */i/ and */u/ according to which they lengthen before unaspirated voiced stops, and that syllable gains rising, acute accent.

Compare;
 PIE *sed- "to sit" (which also gave Latin sedeō, Sanskrit sīdati, Ancient Greek hézomai and English sit) > Proto-Balto-Slavic *sēˀstei (*sēˀd-tei) > Lithuanian sė́sti, OCS sěsti (with regular *dt > *st dissimilation; OCS and Common Slavic yat /ě/ is a regular reflex of PIE/PBSl. */ē/).
 PIE *h₂ébōl "apple" (which also gave English apple) > Proto-Balto-Slavic *āˀbōl > standard Lithuanian obuolỹs (accusative óbuolį) and also dialectal forms of óbuolas and Samogitian óbulas, OCS ablъko, modern Serbo-Croatian jȁbuka, Slovene jábolko etc.

Winter's law is supposed to show the difference between the reflexes of PIE */b/, */d/, */g/, */gʷ/ in Balto-Slavic (in front of which Winter's law operates in closed syllable) and PIE */bʰ/, */dʰ/, */gʰ/, */gʷʰ/ (before which there is no effect of Winter's law). That shows that in relative chronology, Winter's law operated before PIE aspirated stops */bʰ/, */dʰ/, */gʰ/ merged with PIE plain voiced stops */b/, */d/, */g/ in Balto-Slavic.

Secondarily, Winter's law is also supposed to show the difference between the reflexes of PIE *h₂e > */a/ and PIE */o/ which otherwise merged to */a/ in Balto-Slavic. When those vowels lengthen in accordance with Winter's law, old */a/ (< PIE *h₂e) has lengthened into Balto-Slavic */ā/ (which later gave Lithuanian /o/, Latvian /ā/,  OCS /a/), and old */o/ has lengthened into Balto-Slavic */ō/ (which later gave Lithuanian and Latvian uo, but OCS /a/). In later development, which represented Common Slavic innovation, the reflexes of Balto-Slavic */ā/ and */ō/ were merged, and they both result in OCS /a/. This also shows that Winter's law operated prior to the common Balto-Slavic change */o/ > */a/.

The original formulation of Winter's law stated that the vowels regularly lengthened in front of PIE voiced stops in all environments. As much as there were numerous examples that supported this formulation, there were also many counterexamples, such as OCS stogъ "stack" < PBSl. *stagas < PIE *stógos, OCS voda "water" < PBSl. *wadō < PIE * (collective noun formed from PIE *). An adjustment of Winter's law, with the conclusion that it operates only on closed syllables, was proposed by Matasović in 1994. Matasović's revision of Winter's law has been used in the Lexikon der indogermanischen Verben. Other variations of the blocking mechanism for Winter's law have been proposed by Kortlandt, Shintani, Rasmussen, Dybo and Holst.

Criticism
Not all specialists in Balto-Slavic historical linguistics accept Winter's law. A study of counterexamples led Patri (2006) to conclude that there is no law at all. According to him, exceptions to the law create a too heterogeneous and voluminous set of data to allow any phonological generalization.

See also
 Lachmann's law, a similar law occurring in Latin

References
 
 
 
 
 
 
 
 
 

Balto-Slavic languages
Sound laws
1978 introductions